InfoTM is a Chinese technology company that was founded in 2008 as InfoTM Microelectronics Co., Ltd.

Application processors

References

External links 
 InfoTM company website

ARM architecture
Embedded microprocessors
System on a chip
Fabless semiconductor companies
Semiconductor companies of China